In Inuit mythology, Asiaq is a weather goddess (or, more rarely a god) and was quite frequently invoked by the angakoq for good weather, for instance if spring was late it was important to content her and make sure she would send rain and melt the ice.

In Greenland, she is the mother of weather, who decides the quantity and the time for snow to fall.

Asiaq is also the eponym of Asiaq Greenland Survey, a research institute in Nuuk.

References 

  The tale means: "Asiaq, the mistress of wind and weather", the book title means: "Eskimo tales", the series means: "The tales of world literature".
Ostermann in Encyclopedia of Goddesses and Heroines By Patricia Monaghan

Inuit goddesses
Sky and weather goddesses
Rain deities